Šentjanž, Šent Janž, or Št. Janž, after the Slovene name for St. John, is the name of several settlements in Slovenia:

 Šent Janž pri Radljah, Municipality of Radlje
 Šentjanž nad Dravčami, Municipality of Vuzenica
 Šentjanž nad Štorami, Municipality of Štore
 Šentjanž pri Dravogradu, Municipality of Dravograd
 Šentjanž, Rečica ob Savinji, Municipality of Rečica ob Savinji
 Šentjanž, Sevnica, Municipality of Sevnica
 Orehovec, Šmarje pri Jelšah, Municipality of Šmarje pri Jelšah, known as Šent Janž pri Podčetrtku until 1955
 Vinska Gora,  Municipality of Velenje, known as Šent Janž na Vinski Gori until 1955